Preservation Act 2 is a 1974 concept album by the English rock band the Kinks, and their thirteenth studio album. It sold poorly (peaking on the Billboard Top LPs & Tape chart at No. 114), and received a mixed response among critics. Ken Emerson, in Rolling Stone, held out the album as an "underrated" one in the Kinks' repertoire.  

Other critics were less charitable: The A.V. Club described it as "sprawling... with its radio announcements and melodramatic, sub-Andrew Lloyd Webber musical numbers, is a wash, the sound of a once-great band losing the plot." AllMusic referred to it as "a mess, an impenetrable jumble of story, theater, instrumentals, 'announcements,' unfinished ideas, guest singers, and, on occasion, a song or two."

The live performances of the material were much better received, with one critic going so far as to say that the Preservation shows were the first successful fusion of rock and roll with theater: "Ray Davies has finally pulled it off— the Kinks-based theatrical production of Preservation is a great rock concert and a perfectly coordinated musical."

The 1991 CD reissue on Rhino was a two-CD set combining Preservation Act 2 with its 1973 predecessor Preservation Act 1, but with no bonus tracks. The 1998 CD reissue of Act 2 on Velvel featured the outtake "Slum Kids", a popular live piece for the Kinks.

Track listing

Personnel
The Kinks
Ray Davies – vocals, guitar
Dave Davies – guitar, vocals
John Dalton – bass
Mick Avory – drums
John Gosling – keyboards

Additional personnel
Maryann Price, Angi Girton, Pamela Travis, Sue Brown – vocals
Christopher Timothy – "announcer" voice (chosen to mimic his adverts for The Sun)
Chris Musk – "reporter at meeting" voice
Alan Holmes – baritone saxophone, clarinet
Laurie Brown – trumpet, flute, tenor saxophone
John Beecham – trombone, flute

Technical
Roger Beale – engineer 
Pat Doyle – art direction
Bob Searles – design
Jerry Preston – illustration

References

External links

The Kinks albums
1974 albums
Rock operas
RCA Records albums
Albums produced by Ray Davies
Sequel albums